Sandagdorj Handsuren (also spelled Khandsuren, born 5 May 1940) is a Mongolian chess player who holds the FIDE title of Woman International Master (WIM, 1972). She is a winner of the Mongolian Women's Chess Championship (1968).

Biography
From the 1960s to the 1970s, Sandagdorj Handsuren was one of the leading Mongolian women's chess players. In 1968, she won Mongolian Women's Chess Championship. In 1961, Sandagdorj Handsuren participated at Women's World Chess Championship Candidates Tournament in Vrnjačka Banja and ranked 17th place.

Sandagdorj Handsuren played for Mongolia in the Women's Chess Olympiads:
 In 1963, at second board in the 2nd Chess Olympiad (women) in Split (+5, =1, -8),
 In 1972, at second board in the 5th Chess Olympiad (women) in Skopje (+2, =3, -4).

In 1972, she awarded the FIDE Woman International Master (WIM) title.

References

External links
 
 
 

1940 births
Living people
Sportspeople from Ulaanbaatar
Mongolian female chess players
Chess Woman International Masters
Chess Olympiad competitors